was a Japanese actor and voice actor. Throughout his career he was represented by 81 Produce and later Production Baobab. He has referred to both Tokyo and Nagano Prefecture as his hometown.

He was most known for the roles of Tōru Rikiishi (Ashita no Joe) and Daisuke Shima (Space Battleship Yamato). After his retirement, Hideyuki Tanaka took up the role of Daisuke Shima for the PS2 Yamato game series. The role had previously been taken over for the film Final Yamato by Isao Sasaki, but this was before Nakamura's retirement.

Nakamura died on July 30, 2014 at a Tokyo hospital.

Filmography

Anime television series
Ashita no Joe (Tōru Rikiishi)
Ashita no Joe 2 (Tōru Rikiishi)
Attack No. 1 (Coach Hongo)
Ie Naki Ko (Inspector Aimes)
Space Battleship Yamato series (Daisuke Shima)
Gatchaman II (Narration)
Gatchaman F (Sharam)
Ginga Hyōryū Vifam (Fredrick Rodem)
Princess Sarah (Tom Chrisford)
Dancougar - Super Beast Machine God (Narration, Muge Zolbados)
Dororo (Tahoumaru)

OVA
Area 88 (Gou Mutsuki)
Legend of the Galactic Heroes (Franchesk Romski)
Dancougar - Super Beast Machine God (Narration, Muge Zolbados)

Anime films
Attack No. 1 series (Coach Hongo)
Space Battleship Yamato series (Daisuke Shima)

Dub work (TV)
The Courtship of Eddie's Father (Tom Corbett: Bill Bixby)
Ironside (Det. Sgt. Ed: Don Galloway)
Combat! (Jack)
ER (Kadalski: Paul Eiding)
The Fugitive (Larry)
UFO (Lew Waterman: Gary Myers)

Dub work (Film)
Robert Wagner
Halls of Montezuma (1970 TBS edition) (Coffman)
Beneath the 12-Mile Reef (Tony Petrakis)
A Kiss Before Dying (Bud Corliss)
In Love and War (Frank "Frankie" O'Neill)
Harper (Allan Taggert)
The Abyss (Virgil Brigman (Ed Harris))
Alien (1980 Fuji TV edition) (Cain: John Hurt)
Battle of the Bulge (DVD version) (Lt. Weaver: James MacArthur)
Dirty Harry (Chico Gonzales: Reni Santoni)
The Guns of Navarone (Pvt. Pappadimos: James Darren)
Kramer vs. Kramer (Gressen: Bill Moor)
Magnum Force (Neil Briggs: Hal Holbrook)
The Passage (Perea: Marcel Bozzuffi)
Tower of Death (Chin Ku: Hwang Jang-lee)

Tokusatsu
Robotto Keiji (Voice of Detective Robot K)

References

External links
 

1935 births
2014 deaths
Japanese male stage actors
Japanese male video game actors
Japanese male voice actors
Male voice actors from Tokyo
Production Baobab voice actors
81 Produce voice actors